The Purple Line is a part of the Namma Metro metro rail system for the city of Bengaluru, Karnataka, India. As of 2021, the line is 25.7 km and spans 23 stations from Kengeri in the southwest to Baiyappanahalli to the east.  The Purple Line is mostly elevated, with 17 elevated stations, 5 underground stations and 1 at-grade station. The Line passes through many prime activity centers of the city including MG Road, Vidhana Soudha and Majestic station, which is an interchange station between Purple and Green Lines. Phase I of the Purple Line was the first underground metro section in South India.

When Phase II is completed, the Purple Line will have 37 stations between Whitefield in the east and Challaghatta in the southwest, and the length of the line will increase to 42.53 km.

Construction
Purple Line sections were opened as indicated below.

Phase I
Civil construction work on Phase I of the line began on 15 April 2007 and was originally scheduled to be completed in 5 years. However, the project faced delays and missed several deadlines. Difficult tunnel boring conditions through a mixed geology with hard rock caused major delays. The first stretch of Purple Line (Reach 1, fully elevated) between Baiyyappanahalli and Mahatma Gandhi Road was inaugurated on 20 October 2011. Reach 2 (fully elevated) between Mysore Road and Magadi Road commenced operations on 16 November 2015. These two sections operated independently until the final section, the underground stretch between Mahatma Gandhi Road and City Railway station was opened on 30 April 2016, thus linking the previously opened stretches and completing Phase I for the Purple Line.

Costs for the Purple Line were estimated at  4500–5000 crore. The cost of the underground stretch alone amounted to about  1000 crores. Land acquisition for Phase I of the project cost . Loans were secured from several agencies -  from the Japan International Cooperation Agency (JICA),  from the Housing and Urban Development Corporation Limited (HUDCO),  from the Asian Development Bank (ADB), and the rest from a French lending agency. Approximately 10% of the  6500 crore was to be paid as interest by BMRCL each year. The Federation of Karnataka Chambers of Commerce and Industry (FKCCI) had estimated that interest payment alone would be .

The tunnels bored using tunnel boring machines (TBMs) are located approximately 60 feet below ground level, have an outer diameter of 6.5 metres and inner diameter of 5.6 metres, and situated are 5 metres apart. Two Japanese TBMs, Helen and Margarita, were used for tunneling work of the Purple Line. Tunneling work began in May 2011 and completed in May 2014. Underground stations (City railway station, Sir M Visvesvaraya, Vidhana Soudha and Cubbon Park) were built by cut-and-cover method which required 10,000 controlled blasts using 50,000 kg of explosives of 125 gm gel nitrate capsules due to hard granite rock. Blasts were carried out daily from 6 am to 7 am from March 2011 to early 2013 (regulations restricted blasting work from being carried out at other times of the day). Preparation for a single blast took approximately 3.5 hours, with the actual duration of a blast being 5 seconds. Approximately, 20,250 truckloads of debris was excavated during construction. Kolar-based National Institute of Rock Mechanics served as consultant for blasting work. There were no injuries during the entire blasting process. A total of 2500 trees were cut down during the construction of both lines of Phase I.

Reach 1 was originally scheduled to begin operations in March 2010. After missing several deadlines, it was finally opened to the public on 20 October 2011 at 4 pm IST by Union Urban Development Minister Kamal Nath. There was an overwhelming response to the metro at the commencement of operations. As per BMRCL sources within first three days of operations,  people used the mass transit system. At the end of the 4th day, about 200,000 passengers had already commuted on Namma Metro. During the first month, about 1,325,000 people traveled by metro. However, average ridership during the first six months of operation was just 24,900 after the initial euphoria. BMRC earned a total of  during the same period. Namma Metro posted a profit of  after almost one year of operating Reach I. BMRCL estimates that nearly 8 million passengers traveled on the system during its first year of operations.

Reach 2 received clearance to start services (from Satish Kumar Mittal, Commissioner for Metro Rail Safety - CMRS) on 21 September 2015. Reach 2 was opened to the public on 16 November 2015.

BMRCL applied for safety clearance to open the underground stretch in the third week of March 2016. The Commissioner for Railway Safety (CRS) granted clearance to begin operations on the underground section in the first week of April 2016. The underground section was inaugurated by Union Urban Development Minister M. Venkaiah Naidu, Chief Minister Siddaramaiah and other dignitaries at a ceremony at the Vidhana Soudha on 29 April 2016. The inaugural train through the underground section departed from Vidhana Soudha station at 6:35 PM. Namma metro was first driven through the underground section by Loco-pilot Pavithran. The section was opened to the public from 6 AM on 30 April 2016. The following day, 120 trips were operated on the Purple line, transporting about 125,000 passengers. On the first two days of operation, after opening of the underground section, BMRCL collected over 7 million in revenues from the Purple Line.

Phase II
In October 2016, the BMRCL began civil work on the west extension of the Purple Line from Mysore Road to Kengeri (8.81 km), later extended to Challaghatta. Construction work on the Purple Line corridor was awarded in two packages for  660 crore. IL&FS Engineering Construction Company bagged the contract for Reach 2A of 3.94 km (Mysore Road to Pattanagere stretch) that includes four stations at  327 crore. Soma Enterprise won the contract for Reach 2B of 4.86 km (Pattanagere to Kengeri stretch, later extended to Challaghatta), including two stations and a depot at Challaghatta at  332 crore. The land needed for the depot at Challaghatta (which is about 1.5 km away from Kengeri station) was already with BMRCL. Later, the line extension included a new station at Challaghatta, close to the depot.

BMRCL floated tenders for the construction of the 15.5-km elevated stretch from Baiyyappanahalli to Whitefield railway station in December 2016. The tenders for Reach 1A and Reach 1B were floated by BMRC on 1 and 6 December respectively. Reach 1A is an 8.03 km section from Baiyyappanahalli to Sitharama Palya (previously Visveshvaraya Ind. Area). The section includes six new stations and is estimated to cost  670.72 crore. Reach 1B, the 7.21 km section from Kundalahalli to Whitefield, includes seven new stations and is estimated to cost  666.12 crore.

Around 270 buildings were demolished for the construction of Reach 1A and 1B. BMRC spent an estimated  849 crore to acquire properties. Demolition work began in March 2017. Construction work began in February 2018.

The extension from Mysore Road to Kengeri in the southwest opened on 30 August 2021.

Stations

There are 22 stations on the Purple Line. All underground stations were built using the cut-and-cover method. Most underground stations are 300 metres long and 25 metres wide. The interchange station at Majestic is much larger.

Initially, there were no toilets at Namma Metro stations. BMRCL eventually heeded to public demands for toilets and the metro's first toilets were opened at Baiyyappanahalli and Indiranagar stations on 21 June 2013.

In September 2015, it was announced that the proposed Narayanapura metro station would be removed and the proposed Krishnarajapuram metro station would be shifted by 295 metres to the west, due to difficulty in acquiring land in the area. In April 2016, BMRCL revealed that Whitefield metro station, originally proposed to be located 200 metres away from Whitefield railway station, would be shifted so as to be directly opposite the railway station to provide easier connectivity between the metro station and railway station.

Yellow tactile tiles are used at all stations to guide the visually impaired. The tiles start at the ramp and lead to the staircases and lifts.

The list of Purple Line stations below includes stations under construction in Phase ll. The section completed in Phase l between Baiyyapanahalli and Kengeri is currently operational.

Infrastructure

Rolling stock

BMRC procured 150 metro coaches for fifty 3-car train sets in DMC-TC-DMC formation for Phase l of Namma Metro from BEML - Hyundai Rotem at a cost of ₹1,672.50 crore (₹16.72 billion). Coach specifications were as follows:
Dimensions: Length-20.8m, Width-2.88m, and Height-3.8m. Each coach has a seating capacity of about 50 and standing capacity of 306 (basis 8 per sqm). Thus, each train had a capacity of about 1000. Traction was through four 180kW motors in each motor coach. The trains have a maximum speed of 80 km/h and axle load of 15 tonnes. The trains operate on 750V DC with third rail bottom power collector system. Features include stainless steel body fully air-conditioned coaches, longitudinal bank of wide seats, wide vestibules between coaches, non-skid and non-slip floor surfaces, wi-fi enabled, four wide passenger access doors on each side, wide windows, automatic voice announcement system and electronic information and destination display system.

Initial operations on the Purple Line began with twenty-one 3-coach trains. As loads increased with increasing ridership, all trains were converted to six coaches. The first six car train was introduced on the Purple Line on 23 June 2018. The additional coaches were supplied by BEML at a cost of Rs 8.8 crore each.

Traction
Purple Line uses 750 V DC third rail traction.

Signaling
In September 2009, the consortium led by Alstom Project India Limited were awarded a contract worth  to supply control and signalling system for the first phase of the project. The consortium is led by Alstom and composed of Alstom Transport SA, Thales Group Portugal S A and Sumitomo Corporation. Alstom will provide the design, manufacture, supply, installing, testing and commissioning of the train control and signalling system and Thales will provide the design, installing, testing and commissioning of the telecommunication system for Phase I of the metro system. It includes the Urbalis 200 Automatic Train Control system which will ensure optimal safety, flexible operations and heightened passenger comfort.

The integrated control centre at Baiyyappanahalli has direct communication with trains and stations are CCTV fitted with visual and audio service information.

Operations

Frequency
The metro service runs from 5 AM and 12 AM daily. The end-to-end travel time on a Purple Line train is 33 minutes. From 7 November 2016, Purple Line trains began running at an interval of every 4 minutes between 9:10 am and 9:58 am to handle rising passenger traffic during morning peak hour. This timing was later withdrawn as the trains were not operating at optimal capacity. From 27 February 2017, the BMRC introduced a new time-table for weekdays. Headway on the line was changed as follows: 4 minutes (08:30-09:10), 7 minutes (07:00-08:30 and 09:10-10:40), 8 minutes (16:00-20:40) and 15 minutes at all other times.

Metro services have occasionally operated beyond 2200 hours. Services are usually extended on festival days or when an international cricket match is held in Bangalore.

Speed
The system is designed for a maximum train speed of 80 km/h. However, the Research Design and Standards Organization (RDSO) fixed the speed at which trains are allowed to commercially operate at 67.50 km/h on straight sections, 35 km/h on curves, and 45 km/h in stations. The maximum permitted speed on the underground section is 40 km/hr. Purple Line trains usually operate at speeds of 38–40 km/hr. According to metro authorities, the trains require more than 400 metres to accelerate from, or decelerate to a halt. As the inter-station distance on the line is about 1 km, the trains have limited time to run at higher speeds.

Fare collection
Commuters who pay using smartcards receive a 5% discount per transaction.

As of April 2016, 37.59% of commuters on the Purple Line use smart cards, while the rest purchase tokens.

Safety
All stations on the line have 4 emergency exits, and Majestic station has 18 emergency exits. Stations have been built to withstand zone III earthquakes. Bangalore is located in a zone II earthquake area. The tunnels are equipped with walkways to enable passengers to disembark from a train and walk to the nearest station in case of a technical failure. The underground section is also equipped with 5 cross-passages that will enable passengers to move between tunnels, in case a tunnel section fills up with smoke. There are three tunnel cross-passages between Majestic and Sir M Visvesvaraya metro station, and one each between Vidhana Soudha and Central College, and Majestic and City Railway station. All stations were built with flame retardant materials, and also have 100,000 litres of water stored on-site for use in case of a fire.

See also
Namma Metro
 Green Line
 Yellow Line
 Pink Line
 Blue Line
 Orange Line
 List of Namma Metro Stations
 Rapid transit in India
 List of metro systems

Notes

References

External links
 Metro Rail Corporation Ltd. (Official site) 

Namma Metro lines
Railway lines opened in 2011
Japan International Cooperation Agency